Georgia Cassimatis is an Australian journalist.  She has worked on numerous internationally known magazines.

Biography
Georgia Cassimatis was born in Australia, to a Greek (father), from Kythera, and an Australian (mother), . 
She completed a Bachelor of Arts degree, majoring in languages and music, at the University of Sydney. While there, she also won the Honi Soit comedy writing award.
She followed her BA with a master's degree in Journalism at the University of Technology, Sydney. While undertaking this degree, she won an award for her television documentary on politician Tanya Plibersek.

Cassimatis began her career as a writer with the Australian Cosmopolitan magazine in 1996.  She also freelanced for various magazines before being appointed editor of teen magazine Barbie. While working for Barbie she decided to move to Los Angeles.

While based in Los Angeles, Georgia worked as a Los Angeles-based writer, reporting for various U.S. titles such as Glamour, Cosmopolitan, Teen and Marie Claire. During this time, her work was syndicated internationally.

In 2012, Georgia returned to Australia and has continued to write for various publications, including GQ Australia. Her book, Red Carpet Burns: a travel memoir about Los Angeles, was released February 2013 through Harlequin.  Georgia is represented by literary agency Curtis Brown Australia. 

Living people
Year of birth missing (living people)
Australian people of Greek descent
Australian people of British descent
Australian women journalists
Australian journalists
University of Technology Sydney alumni